The 22643 / 44 Ernakulam Junction–Patna Junction Express is a Express train belonging to Indian Railways southern zone that runs between  and  in India.

It operates as train number 22643 from Ernakulam Junction to Patna Junction and as train number 22644 in the reverse direction, serving the states of Tamil Nadu, Kerala, Andhra Pradesh, Odisha, West Bengal, Jharkhand & Bihar.

Coaches
The 22643 / 44  Express has one AC 2-tier, two AC 3-tier, 14 sleeper class, three general unreserved & two SLR (seating with luggage rake) coaches and two high capacity parcel van coaches. It carries a pantry car.

As is customary with most train services in India, coach composition may be amended at the discretion of Indian Railways depending on demand.

Service

As the average speed of the train is slightly above , as per railway rules, its fare includes a Superfast surcharge.

Routing

Traction

References

External links
22643 Ernakulam Patna Express at India Rail Info
 22644 Patna Ernakulam Express at India Rail Info

Express trains in India
Transport in Kochi
Rail transport in Kerala
Rail transport in Tamil Nadu
Rail transport in Andhra Pradesh
Rail transport in Odisha
Rail transport in West Bengal
Rail transport in Jharkhand
Rail transport in Bihar
Transport in Patna